The Forest Rangers is a roots rock band best known for songs from the TV series Sons of Anarchy. The music they created for the TV series was nominated 3 times for Emmy Awards, while it has won 2 HMMA awards and 1 OFTA television award. shaping the series and captivating audiences from 2008 until 2014.

The band was assembled and led by Bob Thiele Jr. (musician and music supervisor), Dave Way. Bob Thiele Jr., and Dave Kushner (guitarist with Velvet Revolver) chose the band's name while writing the show's theme song "This Life" inspired by a Plexi's song named "Forest Ranger". The Forest Rangers went on creating a sound that is consistent with the environment these characters live and breathe in, The Sound of Charming. While the Mayans M.C. listen to Latino music, we never hear anything but rock and country playing in the Charming clubhouse.

"If there was a house band playing at the Sons of Anarchy's clubhouse every Friday night, the Forest Rangers would be the band. The Rangers—heard almost every week on the popular FX drama Sons of Anarchy—wouldn't be out of place hanging at the Teller-Morrow clubhouse in Charming, California." Bob Thiele Jr.

The regular band members are Davey Faragher on bass guitar, John Philip Shenale (often mentioned as Phil Shenale) on keyboards, Greg Leisz on pedal steel guitar, Matt Chamberlain on drums, and Gia Ciambotti on background vocals. The band also collaborates with guest performers for vocals like Alison Mosshart, Amos Lee, Joshua James, The White Buffalo, Billy Valentine, Audra Mae, Justin Warfield, Battleme, Katey Sagal, and others.

Sonic style

Sons of Anarchy redefined how a TV series utilizes music as a powerful narrative element since music plays the role of a character. The soundtrack fits so well because the songs feel exactly what the characters themselves would choose to listen to. Following Kurt Sutter's vision, Thiele Jr. shaped the serie's unique music style which consists of a jambalaya of original music and covers from established artists but mostly from indie artists and bands.  A lot of the music from the show comes from not just biker bands that existed around the time the MCs became an iconic American entity but also blues bands.

Because of the production's small budget for music, Bob Thiele Jr. went to independents in order to include "big-ticket copyrights".  As a music supervisor, he knew how essential it is for artists and writers to get songs on TV shows for their exposure to the audience, for example The White Buffalo gained significant career traction and an Emmy nomination from his collaboration with Bob Thiele Jr. and The Forest Rangers. Haunting covers of well known songs by voices you couldn't recognize when they first aired compliment the hero's tragic journey along with original songs and enhance the audience's emotional journey to catharsis.

"I brought Bob into the process early to really try to figure out how to create a sound for the show since I just knew that Sons Of Anarchy was a somewhat bleak world and we were going to be dealing with somewhat dark and potentially heavy subject matter. It was really Bob’s idea to create a unique sound for the show. Going back to the origins of the subculture and when and how it hit the media, what we needed to do is hit on what the sound in the subculture is–sort of that 60’s California sound, which sort of became our touchstone" Kurt Sutter

The music created by Bob Thiele Jr. and The Forest Rangers serves the story of SoA. Music doesn't underscores the scene but a lot of times it's leading it, forming a connection between the present and the past. The Hamlet theme of Sons of Anarchy (Clay kills "JT", John Teller, Jax's father and then marries Jax's mother, Gemma; Jax discovers the murder, is in anguish and begins his slow plotting of revenge) is underlinded by the theme song of the series which keeps reminding us that we "Got to look this life in the eye" (This Life by Curtis Stigers, Dave Kushner and Bob Thiele Jr.) because "something is rotten in the state of Denmark" (Hamlet, Shakespeare).

"By the end of season one, it was like, 'Okay, we can really use music as a way to tell our story,' Music is a character on the show. Music is just one more aspect of storytelling. If I sat down and listened to all of the major montages, I'd probably leave five or six out because we do so many of them." Bob Thiele Jr.

While all songs server their purpose the montage set to a cover of Queen's "Bohemian Rhapsody" stands out for taking chances on a well known song. Bob Thiele Jr. started with a voice and an accoustic guitar but later a question was posed: "What if it's little kids singing it?" Three kids from The Center for Early Education sung a three-part harmony guided by their choral director Ellen who did the arrangement and helped building the haunting montage of the episode "Black Widower" by using a cover which combines rock, blues and traditional country with kids singing (Season 7, Episode 1).

Discography

The Forest Rangers are mostly known for their covers of well known songs and their original songs for the soundtrack of the FX TV series Sons of Anarchy. They have been successful and have continued to release songs as EPs, studio albums, and singles.

"The music, to a larger extent, had to come from a similar place than the characters, that there was an authenticity, a rawness... that you got a sense of authenticity from the characters and the music had to match that. That's why music resonates on so many levels, across age groups. It's something that people can go into and say "Wow, this is authentic." Bob Thiele Jr.

The Forest Rangers released 4 volumes of songs as soundtrack albums (Songs of Anarchy: Music from Sons of Anarchy Seasons 1–4, Sons of Anarchy: Songs of Anarchy Vol. 2, Sons of Anarchy: Songs of Anarchy Vol. 3, Sons of Anarchy: Songs of Anarchy Vol. 4 ), 3 EPs (The first five-song EP, entitled Sons of Anarchy: North Country – EP, was released on September 8, 2009, and featured the full version of the Emmy Award nominated theme song "This Life". A second five-song EP, entitled Sons of Anarchy: Shelter – EP, was released on November 24, 2009, while a third six-song EP, entitled Sons of Anarchy: The King is Gone - EP, was released on November 23, 2010) and numerous singles.

The band released its debut album, Land Ho! (2015) after launching a successful PledgeMusic campaign for its recording. The album is co-produced by Bob Thiele Jr. and producer/engineer Dave Way. Besides the regular band members (Davey Faragher/bass, John Philip Shenale/keyboards, Greg Leisz/pedal steel guitar, Matt Chamberlain/drums, Gia Ciambotti/background vocals), guest vocals included Alison Mosshart, Amos Lee, Joshua James, The White Buffalo, Billy Valentine, Audra Mae and Justin Warfield. The 11 songs on Land Ho! span a range of genres from Americana to bluesy roots rock to epic soulful ballads.

In 2018, The Forest Rangers contributed to the Mayans M.C. soundtrack with the song "Black is Black".

Songs from Sons of Anarchy episodes 

{| class="wikitable"
|-
! Year !! Song !! feat. Artist !! Sons of Anarchy episode
|-
| 2008 || Theme Song of Sons of Anarchy|| Curtis Stigers|| All Episodes 
|-
| 2008 || Ending Theme Song of Sons of Anarchy|| - || All Episodes 
|-
| 2008 || "This Life" || Curtis Stigers|| SE1E1 Pilot
|-
| 2008 || "Son of a Preacher Man"|| Katey Sagal || SE1E2 Seeds   
|-
| 2008 || "I'm Eighteen"|| - || SE1E5 Giving Back
|-
| 2008 || "Blue Angel" || Billy Valentine|| SE1E6 AK-51
|-
| 2008 || "Fortunate Son" || Lyle Workman|| SE1E9 Hell Followed 
|-
| 2008 || "Forever Young" || Audra Mae || SE1E12 The Sleep of Babies
|-
| 2008 || "John The Revelator"|| Curtis Stigers || S1E13 The Revelator
|-
| 2009 || "The Places I Can't Afford To Go" || Bob Neuwirth|| S2E10 Balm 
|-
| 2009 || "Someday Never Comes"|| Billy Valentine|| S2E12 The Culling 
|-
| 2009 ||  "Gimme Shelter" ||  Paul Brady || S2E13 Na Trioblóidí
|-
| 2009 ||  "No Milk Today" ||  Joshua James || SE3E1 So
|-
| 2010 ||  "Into Thy Hands"||  - || SE3E2 Oiled
|-
| 2010 ||  "Bird on the Wire" ||  Katey Sagal || SE3E4 Home 
|-
| 2010 || "Travelin' Band"  ||  Curtis Stigers || SE3E7 Widering Eye
|-
| 2010 ||  "Miles Away" ||  Battleme & Slash || SE3E13 NS
|-
| 2011 || "What a Wonderful World"|| Alison Mosshart|| SE4E1 Out
|-
| 2011 || "John The Revelator"|| Curtis Stigers|| SE4E1 Out
|-
| 2011 || "Have At It" || - || SE4E1 Out
|-
| 2011 || "Anarquia" || Olmeca || SE4E7 Fruit for the Crows
|-
| 2011 || "Strange Fruit" || Katey Sagal || SE4E7 Fruit for the Crows 
|-
| 2011 || "Dreaming of You" || Sarah White|| SE4E8 Family Recipe
|-
| 2011 || "Time" || Battleme|| SE4E10 Hands
|-
| 2011 || "The House of the Rising Sun"|| The White Buffalo || SE4E14 To Be, Act 2 
|-
| 2012 || "Higher Ground" || Franky Perez|| SE5E1 Sovereign 
|-
| 2012 || "The Unclouded Day" || Audra Mae|| SE5E5 Orca Shrugged 
|-
| 2012 || "The Passenger" ||Alison Mosshart|| SE5E7 Toad's Wild Ride
|-
| 2012 || "Lights" || Battleme|| SE5E9 Andare Pescare
|-
| 2012 || "Blind Ride" || Alison Mosshart|| SE5E10 Crucifixed
|-
| 2012 || "To Sir With Love"|| Katey Sagal|| SE5E13 J' ai Obtenu Cette
|-
| 2013 || "(Sittin' On) The Dock of the Bay" || Billy Valentine|| SE6E1 Straw
|-
| 2013 || "As Tears Go By"|| Noah Gundersen|| SE6E2 One One Six
|-
| 2013 || "Running Blues"|| Jennifer O'Connor|| SE6E3 Poenitentia
|-
| 2013 || "Everyday People" || Audra Mae, Billy Valentine, Katey Sagal, Curtis Stigers, Franky Perez|| SE6E3 Poenitentia
|-
| 2013 || "Sitting on Top of the World"|| Chris Goss|| SE6E4 Wolfsangel
|-
| 2013 || "John The Revelator"|| Curtis Stigers|| SE6E6 Salvage
|-
| 2013 || "Love Is My Religion"|| Franky Perez || S6E7 Sweet and Vaded 
|-
| 2013 || "For a Dancer"|| Katey Sagal|| SE6E10 Huang Wu
|-
| 2013 || "I See Through You (Free Your Mind)"|| Battleme|| SE6E11 Aon Rud Persanta
|-
| 2013 || "Day is Gone"|| Noah Gundersen|| SE6E13 A Mother's Work
|-
| 2014 || "Never My Love" || Billy Valentine|| SE7E1 Black Widower
|-
| 2014 || "Bohemian Rhapsody"|| The White Buffalo, Billy Valentine, Franky Perez|| SE7E1 Black Widower
|-
| 2014 || "Baby, Please Don't Go"||  Franky Perez|| SE7E2 Toil and Till
|-
| 2014 || "Baby, Please Don't Go"||  Franky Perez|| SE7E4 Poor Little Lamps
|-
| 2014 || "The Age Of The Aquarius/Let The Sun Shine In"||  Joshua James|| SE7E5 Some Strange Eruption
|-
| 2014 || "Gotta Love" ||  Justin Warfield|| SE7E6 Smoke 'em if You Got 'em
|-
| 2014 || "Greensleeves"||  Katey Sagal|| SE7E7 Greensleeves
|-
| 2014 || "All Along the Watchtower"||  Gabe Witcher|| SE7E8 The Separation of Crows
|-
| 2014 || "All Along the Watchtower"||  Billy Valentine|| SE7E8 The Separation of Crows
|-
| 2014 || "Boots of Spanish Leather"<ref>{{Cite web |last=Rolling |first=Stone |date=November 10, 2014 |title=Hear a Moody Take on Dylan's 'Boots of Spanish Leather' From 'Sons of Anarchy'. House band the Forest Rangers and singer Amos Lee draw out emotional nuance from the classic 'The Times They Are a-Changin track |url=https://www.rollingstone.com/tv-movies/tv-movie-news/hear-a-moody-take-on-dylans-boots-of-spanish-leather-from-sons-of-anarchy-236467/ |website=RollingStone}}</ref>||  Amos Lee|| SE7E10 Faith and Despondency
|-
| 2014 || "Trying to Believe You're Mine" ||  Alison Mosshart|| SE7E10 Faith and Despondency
|-
| 2014 || "Blessed Assurance" ||  - || SE7E11 Suits of Woe
|-
| 2014 || "Greensleeves"||  Katey Sagal|| SE7E12 Red Rose
|-
| 2014 || "Come Join The Murder"|| The White Buffalo|| SE7E13 Papa's Goods 
|-
|}

Albums

EPs

Singles

Music videos
 "Trying to Believe" (2015) is from Bob Thiele Jr. and The Forest Rangers' album Land Ho!. It was shot in Los Angeles by director Kenneth Cappelo and features Sons of Anarchy'' cast members Mark Boone, Jr. (Bobby Munson), Niko Nicotera (Ratboy), Dayton Callie (Wayne Unser), Michael Ornstein (Chucky) alongside Bob Thiele, Jr. and Alison Mosshart. 
 "I'm Alive" (2015). Lyric video directed by Shelby Duncan.

Tours
In 2013 The Forest Rangers launched their first music tour with Katey Sagal. The live show featured several of the SOA songs among others and in addition to the musical aspect of the touring show, it included a moderated panel conversation with Sagal (Gemma) and cast members Theo Rossi (Juice) and Ryan Hurst (Opie). The band went on touring in 2014 with only a handful of appearances because of Sons of Anarchy's filming.

The core musicians behind "The Forest Rangers" formed a band named "The Reluctant Apostles" with Katey Sagal as their lead singer.

Trivia
In 2015 The Forest Rangers released "Come Join The Murder" with John Doe. They donated their profit to the Pablove Foundation honiring Childhood Cancer Awareness Month.

Bob Thiele Jr.'s father, Bob Thiele co-wrote the song What a Wonderful World; it became a well known song after it appeared on Good Morning Vietnam. The song appeared in Season 4, Episode 1. Out in a montage which showed 10 murder with a cover of the song by The Forest Rangers and Alison Mosshart.

References

External links

Sons of Anarchy
American rock music groups
Roots rock music groups
Musical groups with year of establishment missing